West Hawai'i Explorations Academy (WHEA), officially West Hawaii Explorations Academy Public Charter School, is a public charter school located in Kailua-Kona, Hawai'i, United States, founded on May 4, 2000. It includes a middle school (grades 6–8) and a high school (9-12), with a total student body of about 280.  The school has a project based curriculum with emphasis placed on individual time management, technical writing, and experiential research.  Most WHEA projects can be classified as either marine, Malama 
aina (taking care of the land), or energy related.
The school motto is "No Child Left Indoors" which reflects the school's focus on getting students outdoors and into the community to participate in meaningful hands-on education. The program was originally created as a school-within-a-school of Konawaena High School where students with at least a 3.6 GPA could attend for a semester. Currently, the school does not screen students on the basis of academic merit, although it does tend to attract self-motivated students interested in science.
In 2005, WHEA was honored by the Blue Ribbon Lighthouse School Awards, and Intel and Scholastic Schools of Distinction.
The school is located on the site of the Natural Energy Laboratory of Hawaii Authority on Keahole Point, on the Island of Hawaii, within walking distance of tide pools where organisms are sometimes collected for study and research.

Application and Admission 
WHEA is a public charter school, so all students are allowed to apply for attendance free of tuition. Application forms are available on their website. Admission is generally first apply, first enrolled, starting in February, but a lottery and waiting list are employed on "draw days" at the first of the month if demand out strips supply for spaces. Recently however, the lottery has not been in place due to a shrinking student body.

References

Public high schools in Hawaii
Public middle schools in Hawaii
Schools in Hawaii County, Hawaii
Charter schools in Hawaii
Educational institutions established in 2000
2000 establishments in Hawaii